Shailyn Pierre-Dixon (born June 1, 2003) is a Canadian actress.<ref>{{cite news|url=http://blogs.indiewire.com/shadowandact/meet-the-book-of-negroes-young-aminata-shailyn-pierre-dixon-20150115|title=Meet 'The Book of Negroes Young Aminata - Shailyn Pierre-Dixon|work=Indiewire|date=January 15, 2015|archiveurl=https://web.archive.org/web/20170215072615/http://www.indiewire.com/2015/01/meet-the-book-of-negroes-young-aminata-shailyn-pierre-dixon-235376/|archivedate=February 15, 2017}}</ref> She is best known for her role as the young Aminata in the television miniseries The Book of Negroes, for which she won the Canadian Screen Award for Best Supporting Actress in a Drama Series  in 2016. She has also appeared in the films The Best Man Holiday, Suicide Squad and Jean of the Joneses, and she plays the character Frances in the television series Between''.

Early life 
Pierre-Dixon was born June 1, 2003 in Caledon, Ontario to parents, Christina Dixon, a Canadian actress, writer, and producer, and Maurice Pierre. She attributes her interest in acting to her mother, after seeing her on set. She is enrolled in the drama program at Mayfield Secondary School.

Career 
Pierre-Dixon began her career as a child model, appearing in commercials and advertisements. Her first major role was in the 2013 Hollywood film, The Best Man Holiday, as Kelly, the on-screen daughter of Regina Hall and Harold Perrineau. She played the role of young Aminata in the 2015 CBC miniseries The Book of Negroes. Her performance in The Book of Negroes led to a Canadian Screen Award for Best Supporting Actress in a Drama Series at the 4th Canadian Screen Awards in 2016. From 2015 to 2016, Pierre-Dixon appeared as Frances in the Netflix and CityTV series, Between. In 2016, she appeared in Jean of the Joneses as Mary Jones and Suicide Squad as Zoe Lawton, the daughter of Deadshot (played by Will Smith).

In 2015, Pierre-Dixon had the honor of presenting at the Canadian Screen Awards, making her one of the youngest presenters in the Academy's history at 11 years old.

Filmography

References

External links

2003 births
Canadian television actresses
Canadian film actresses
Canadian child actresses
Black Canadian actresses
Canadian people of Trinidad and Tobago descent
Living people
Best Supporting Actress in a Drama Series Canadian Screen Award winners